McCloud may refer to:

Places
McCloud, California, a small town
McCloud High School, in the above town
McCloud River, California

Fictional characters
Fox McCloud, the main character in the Star Fox series
Fox's father, List of characters in the Star Fox series#James McCloud
The title character of Brewster McCloud, a 1970 film by Robert Altman
Sam McCloud, main character of McCloud (TV series), an American television police drama that aired from 1970 to 1977
Louise "Lou" McCloud, from the television series The Young Riders
Ace McCloud, one of the main character from the television series The Centurions (TV series)
Fin McCloud, on the Teletoon Canadian animated sitcom Stoked (TV series)
Scott McCloud, the main character of the Space Angel cartoon series

Other uses
McCloud (surname), an English-language surname
 McCloud (TV series), an American television police drama that aired from 1970 to 1977
McCloud Railway, a former railway which operated near Mount Shasta, California, from 1992 to 2009

Similar names
 MacLeod (disambiguation)
 McLoud (disambiguation)